The 1999–2000 Creighton Bluejays men's basketball team represented Creighton University during the 1999–2000 NCAA Division I men's basketball season. The Bluejays, led by head coach Dana Altman, played their home games at the Omaha Civic Auditorium. The Jays finished with a 23-10 record, and won the Missouri Valley Conference tournament to earn an automatic bid to the 2001 NCAA tournament.

Roster

Schedule and results
 
|-
!colspan=9 style=| Regular season

|-
!colspan=9 style=| Missouri Valley Conference tournament

|-
!colspan=9 style=| 2000 NCAA tournament

References

Creighton
Creighton
Creighton Bluejays men's basketball seasons
Creighton Bluejays men's bask
Creighton Bluejays men's bask